"Live" Full House is the first live album by American rock band The J. Geils Band, released in 1972.

The album peaked at #54 on the Billboard 200 album chart in the United States. The tracks "Looking for a Love" and "Serves You Right to Suffer" enjoyed considerable radio airplay, thus setting up the breakthrough success of the band's next album, 1973's Bloodshot. The album was cited as one of the top five live rock'n'roll albums of all time by Walter de Paduwa.

The album's cover depicts a poker hand, but the hand shown is not a "full house" as defined by the rules of the game (this is intentional; the Queen in the poker hand is winking). The title is also a play on words, referring to a packed concert venue or "full house" by concert promoters.

Recording
This was the first of three live albums recorded by the J. Geils Band. The others were Blow Your Face Out in 1976 and Showtime! in 1982.

Although living in Boston, the band had always considered Detroit their second home because of their enormous popularity there. Two of their three live albums were recorded in Detroit at various venues. The third live album was recorded in Detroit and Boston.

Track listing

Side one
"First I Look at the Purse" (Robert Rogers, Smokey Robinson) – 3:56
"Homework" (Dave Clark, Al Perkins, Otis Rush) – 2:34
"Pack Fair and Square" (Walter Travis Price) – 1:41
"Whammer Jammer" (Juke Joint Jimmy) – 2:21
"Hard Drivin' Man" (J. Geils, Peter Wolf) – 4:23

Side two
"Serves You Right to Suffer" (John Lee Hooker) – 9:32
"Cruisin' for a Love" (Juke Joint Jimmy) – 3:32
"Looking for a Love" (J. W. Alexander, Zelda Samuels) – 4:55

Personnel
The J. Geils Band
Peter Wolf – lead vocals
J. Geils – guitar
Magic Dick – harmonica
Seth Justman – keyboards
Danny Klein – bass
Stephen Jo Bladd – drums, vocals

Production
Producers: Geoffrey Haslam, J. Geils Band
Engineer: Geoffrey Haslam
Live mixing: Dinky Dawson
Arranger: J. Geils

Charts

References

The J. Geils Band albums
1972 live albums
Atlantic Records live albums